Suburban FM is a commercial Australian podcast and radio station based in Townsville, Queensland and owned by Townsville Podcasting. The station first commenced broadcasting in 2008 on the web and then moved to the airwaves.

In 2009, Suburban FM commenced a weekly radio show. The station broadcasts with their original main host, Nicholas O'Sullivan. Suburban FM is aimed at modern technology fans, appealing to them through a variety of weekly talk shows. The station also interviews local bands and celebrities on a regular basis.

See also
Media in Townsville

External links
Suburban FM

Australian radio networks
Radio stations in Queensland